Priscilla Marie Pointer (born May 18, 1924) is an American retired actress. She began her career in the theater in the late 1940's, including productions on Broadway. Later, Pointer moved to Hollywood and making appearances on television in the early 1950s. 

She didn't however become a regular screen actress until the 1970's.

She is the mother of actress and singer Amy Irving, (whom she often appeared alongside as her mother or mother-in-law) therefore making her the former mother-in-law of filmmakers Steven Spielberg and Bruno Barreto and the mother-in-law of documentary filmmaker Kenneth Bowser, Jr.

Personal life
Pointer was born on May 18, 1924 in New York City. Her mother Augusta Leonora (née Davis) was an artist and an illustrator, and her father Kenneth Keith Pointer was an artist. One of her maternal great-grandfathers, Jacob Barrett Cohen, was from a Jewish family that had lived in the United States since the 1700s.

Marriages and family
Pointer was previously married to film and stage director Jules Irving, former artistic director of Lincoln Center, from 1947 until his death in 1979; they are the parents of Katie Irving, director David Irving, and actress Amy Irving. In 1980, she married actor/director/producer Robert Symonds, who had been Jules Irving's producing partner at Lincoln Center. She appeared several times in stage productions with Symonds, and they remained married until the latter's death in 2007. Her granddaughter is artist and photographer Austin Irving

Career

Early career
Pointer has been a performer, since thee late 1940s starting her career in theatre and appearing on Broadway, and she featured in the TV series China Smith  (The New Adventures of China Smith) in 1954. After a long hiatus she seemed to have caught the acting bug again, in the early 1970s and has been a regular performing ever since.

Pointer' first major starring role was on the TV soap opera Where the Heart Is as Adrienne Harris Rainey from 1972 and 1973

Films
Pointer has appeared in many films, including Carrie (1976), in which she played the onscreen mother of Amy Irving's character; The Onion Field (1979); Mommie Dearest (1981); Twilight Zone: The Movie (1983); A Nightmare on Elm Street 3: Dream Warriors (1987); David Lynch's Blue Velvet; and Coyote Moon (1999). In addition to Carrie, she has played onscreen mother to Amy Irving in Honeysuckle Rose (1980) and Carried Away (1996). They were both in the films The Competition in 1980 and Micki & Maude in 1984.

Pointer appeared in three films that her son David Irving directed: Rumpelstiltskin (a 1987 musical version, which starred her daughter), Good-bye, Cruel World, and C.H.U.D. II: Bud the C.H.U.D.

Television

She has made many guest appearances on television, including Adam-12, L.A. Law, The A-Team, Judging Amy, The Rockford Files, and Cold Case.

From 1981 to 1983, Pointer had a recurring role on the soap opera Dallas as Rebecca Barnes Wentworth, the mother of Cliff Barnes (Ken Kercheval), Pamela Barnes Ewing (Victoria Principal), and Katherine Wentworth (Morgan Brittany).

Filmography

Film

Partial Television Credits

References

External links
 
 
 

1924 births
Living people
Actresses from New York City
American film actresses
American soap opera actresses
American stage actresses
American television actresses
Jewish American actresses
21st-century American Jews
21st-century American women